The Secretary of State for Universities, Research, Development and Innovation was an official post of the Ministry of Science, Innovation and Universities of the Government of Spain that existed from 1977 to 2020. The Secretary of State was appointed by the King of Spain after being nominated by the Science Minister.

As the second highest office of the Ministry, the Secretary of State was responsible for the direction of the competencies assigned to the Ministry over science, R&D&I and universities. The Secretary of State designed and directed, in coordination with the Secretary of State for Education, the scholarship and study aid programs and coordinated the efforts of the different Spanish public administrations and the European institutions.

The Secretary of State also took care of the well administration and distribution of the European community funds destined to universities, science and research and it secured the equal and universal access and no discrimination to universities and science with special attention to the role of women in this area.

Because of his position, the Secretary of State was also the President of the State Research Agency and the President of the Centre for the Development of Industrial Technology.

History
The Secretariat of State was created for the first time in 1977 with the name of Secretariat of State for Universities and Innovation and was integrated in the Ministry of Education and Science but it was soon replaced by the Ministry of Universities and Science created in 1979. This ministry was suppressed in 1981 and the secretariat of state was activated again and integrated in the Ministry of Education.

The significant modification happened in 2000. During the Second Aznar Government, the Ministry of Science and Technology was created and assumed the competences over R&D&I and science, but the competences over universities were maintained in the Ministry of Education. At this time, the Secretary of State for Education assumed the competences over universities and in the Ministry of Science was created the Secretariat of State for Scientific and Technological Policy.

In 2004, the Prime Minister José Luis Rodríguez Zapatero merged the Ministry of Education and the Ministry of Science and the Secretariat of State for Universities and Research was created again. In his second government, Zapatero revived the Ministry of Science but split the secretariat of state in two. In 2009 the Secretariat of State for Universities was suppressed and all its competences were assumed by the General Secretariat of Universities in the Ministry of Education.

In 2012, the new government of Mariano Rajoy continued with the major austerity plan started by Zapatero to improve the economy which started with the reduction of dozens of high-ranking officials. This provoked that disappearance of the Ministry of Science and most of its competences were granted to the Ministry of Economy, which had as one of its major departments the Secretariat of State for Research, Development and Innovation. The General Secretariat for Universities was also eliminated and its competences were assumed, once again, by the Secretary of State for Education.

Once that the crisis was over, the change of government in 2018 it brought with it the enlargement of the State Administration with the creation of new ministerial departments like the Ministry of Science, that assumed its old competences.

Names
 Secretary of State for Universities and Research (1977-1979)
 Minister for Universities and Research (1979-1981)
 Secretary of State for Universities and Research (1981-1996)
 Secretary of State for Universities, Research and Innovation (1996-2000)
 Secretary of State for Education and Universities (2000-2004)
 Secretary of State for Scientific and Technological Policy (2000-2004)
 Secretary of State for Universities and Research (2004-2008).
 Secretary of State for Universities (2008-2009)
 Secretary of State for Research (2008-2011)
 General Secretariat of Universities (2009-2011)
 Secretary of State for Research, Development and Innovation (2011-2018).
 Secretary of State for Education, Vocational Training and Universities (2011-2018).
 Secretary of State for Universities, Research, Development and Innovation (2018–2020)

Structure
To carry out its duties, the Secretariat of State was divided in three major departments and two non-ministerial bodies:
 The General Secretariat for Universities.
 It's a department that has a long history inside of the Administration and that sometimes was granted with autonomy. It's the highest university body responsible for developing the university policy, it elaborates regulation drafts and it promotes the scientific collaboration in universities in coordination with the General Secretariat for Scientific Policy Coordination.
The General Secretariat for Universities is divided in three departments: the Deputy Directorate-General for Planning, Monitoring and Management of University Teaching, the Deputy Directorate General for Titles and the Deputy Directorate-General for University Teaching Training, Programming and Student Attention.
 The Directorate-General for Research, Development and Innovation.
It's the department responsible for the public investments in innovation, the promotion in strategic areas of technological platforms, the promotion of R&D&I, the promotion of the Spanish participation in the European Union R&D&I programs and the scientific divulgation.
 The Directorate-General is divided in two departments: the Deputy Directorate-General for the Promotion of Innovation and the Deputy Directorate-General for Planning, Monitoring and Evaluation.
 The Deputy Directorate-General for Coordination and Institutional Relations.
 Directly dependent from the Secretariat of State, this department coordinates and support all the bodies of the country destined to universities and research, administers the national awards for research, innovation and design and it does studies, research and reports.

Along with the mentioned departments, the Secretariat of State was the directly responsible of the State Research Agency and the Centre for the Development of Industrial Technology.

List of State Secretaries

The coloured secretaries of state hadn't all the competences described in this article.

References

External links
 Marca España (Brand Spain) website

Secretaries of State of Spain
Research in Spain
Research and development in Spain